Bade (also spelled Bede, Bedde, or Bode) is a West Chadic language spoken by the Bade people in Yobe State and Jigawa State, Nigeria.  Their traditional ruler is the Emir of Bade. Similar to many other Western African languages, Bade is a vulnerable language at great risk of extinction.  With 250,000 speakers, the language and the culture of the Bade people have suffered over the last several years. As the language continues to fade, the culture and historic value associated with the language perishes as well. The local dialect is shifting from Bade to Hausa. Across West Africa, the impact on local communities through the loss of the indigenous tongues will be significant. The endangerment of the Bade language represents the worldwide language diversity that is at risk. Many African languages have only received little linguistic attention, impacting these African languages.

Classification 
Bade is classified under the following categories: Afro-Asiatic, Chadic, West, B, B.1, Bade Proper.

History 
While historical information about the Bade language is limited in scope, many words in the Bade language take root in the Kanuri language. The Kanuri language is primarily spoken in West Africa, including: Nigeria and Chad. Bade and Ngizim have borrowed a number of words from the Kanuri language. According to traditional accounts, the Bade language itself originates from the Badr of Yemen and the Prophet Muhammad purportedly drove the Bade people out after a failure to pray. Currently, as one of the many Nigerian endangered languages, bade serves as a local dialect. In general, Nigerian languages comprise the wealth of linguistic diversity that exists in the country. Over the years, colonization has also played a role in the deteroriation of local languages.

Geographic distribution 
The speakers of the Bade language are centered in Nigeria. It is spoken in the northern part of Yobe State, Nigeria.

Official status 
The language is not the official language of Nigeria or any other country.

Dialects/varieties 
There are three dialects of the Bade language that coincide with regions: 
 Gashua Bade (Mazgarwa)
 Southern Bade (Bade-Kado)
 Western Bade (Amshi, Maagwaram, Shirawa)

Phonology 
Most West Chadic languages have a similar consonant inventory separated into eight major groups: labialized laryngeal, laryngeal, labialized velar, velar, lateral, alveopalatal, alveolar, and labial. In the Bade/Ngizim languages, the glottal stop plays no role, but the vowel hiatus relies on elision and coalescence. The sounds also feature a "yawning" and has a shift from fricative to stop.

Grammar 
The grammar for the Bade language is consistent with the Ngizim language.

Morphology and syntax 
The Bade/Ngizim languages slightly differ from other Chadic languages. Bade and Ngizim have long vowels in closed syllables. Mid vowels also have a restricted use compared to other vowels. Mid vowels will rather appear as loanwords from other languages. The language preserves diphthongs in both native and loanwords.

Vocabulary 
The Bade language has strong influence from the Kanuri language. There are many loanwords from Kanuri to West Chadic languages, including Bade. Bade is commonly grouped with the Ngizim language. As an example, the word "healthy" is "nga" in the Kanuri language and 'ngā' in the Ngizim language. More recently, the Hausa language has influenced the Bade language.

Fish names
Below are some fish names of the Hadejia-Nguru wetlands in Bade, along with their Hausa and Manga Kanuri equivalent names. Note that many of the species have not been observed recently, due to the drying up of the region.

{| class="wikitable sortable"
! Scientific name !! English !! Bade !! Hausa !! Manga !! Present in 2003?
|-
|  || fish (general) ||  || kíífíí || búnì || 
|-
|  ||  || kur cibil || ? ||  || 
|-
|  ||  || awgirin || kanze ||  || 
|-
|  ||  || amimiwal || kúr̃úƙúllìì ||  || 
|-
| Hepsetus odoe || African pike || njig duwaŋ ||  || kiribuni || No
|-
| Labeo coubie || African carp ||  ||  ||  || No
|-
| Synodontis spp. || catfish ||  || ƙùrúngùù ||  || No
|-
| Citharinus citharus, Citharinus latus || lutefish || kalafan || báánàà || palewal || No
|-
| Hemichromis bimaculatus, Hemichromis fasciatus || jewelfish ||  || bakar ||  || 
|-
| Heterotis niloticus || bonytongue || ufdakon, ebugancen || bárgìì || baya || Yes
|-
| Mormyrus macrophthalmus ||  || patima kururun || burar buzu ||  || 
|-
| Labeo senegalensis || African carp || gadabdan || búrdòò || bәskәm || No
|-
| Marcusenius ihyuysi ||  || gulen || dagari || lamsa || Yes
|-
| Epiplatys spp., Aplocheilichthys spp. || killifish/panchax, toothed carp || ak dakwan || dankya, akunu ||  || 
|-
| Barbus spp. ||  || buk zәmәn || digila, bakin burdo || bәskәm, cilim || only seen near Geidam
|-
| Brycinus leuciscus || African tetras || wasan || dindukuri || mәɗi || No
|-
| Oreochromis aureus (formerly Tilapia aurea) || tilapia || kafakun || duguru || kawowo || Yes
|-
| Parachanna obscura || snakehead || mudugun || dúmnóó || dumno || No
|-
| Clarias submarginatus || catfish ||  || dundin ||  || 
|-
| Clarotes sp. ? || ? ||  || dùrùdúrùù ||  || 
|-
| Labeo sp. || African carp ||  || ɗán dáátàà ||  || 
|-
| Citharinus citharus, Citharinus latus || lutefish ||  || fàlfàl || fálfàl || 
|-
| Sarotherodon galileus (formerly Tilapia galilaea) || tilapia || kafakun heta || fárín wala || holo || Yes
|-
| Protopterus annectens || lungfish || ambun || gáìwáá || ambu || Yes
|-
| Heterobranchus bidorsalis ||  || mәsan || gara raka (?) || ? || 
|-
| Polypterus spp. || bichir fish || awiɗon || gàrgázáá, garza || bàràkádí || No
|-
| Lates niloticus || Nile perch || kaɓәlin || gííwár̃ rúwááɓáríyàà || ɓariya || No
|-
| Mormyrus isidori || ? ||  || hààlàɓà ||  || 
|-
| Clarias sp. || catfish || aalan || jàríí || ari || Yes
|-
| Brycinus macrolepidotus || African tetras || ? || kándáurákàà || ? || No
|-
| Ichthyborus besse || ? but cf. ‘otter’ ||  || kàren rúwáá ||  || 
|-
| Tilapia spp. || tilapia || ɗiɗikir || kárfásáá ||  || Yes
|-
| Distichodus spp. || grasseater || kaskasan || káwsàà cihaki ||  || 
|-
| Tetraodon fahaka || pufferfish || kuɗiɗin mәfkәtәn, məkfətən || kómbání || kube || No
|-
| Dasyatis garouaensis || dotted ray || wurjik duwan || kunaman rúwáá ||  || 
|-
| Mormyrus rume || elephantsnout fish, trunkfish ||  || lámsàà ||  || 
|-
| Parailia pellucida ||  || kalapar || lapar || lapar || Yes
|-
| Schilbe spp. || butter catfish || ganun || lûlúú mai kaya || lulu || 
|-
| Chrysichthys sp. ||  ||  || mai barewa ||  || 
|-
| Tilapia zilii || tilapia || kafakun suk jijin || mai gidan gaci karfasa shuri || kawowo || Yes
|-
| Heterobranchus spp. ||  || ? || mài leemu || ? || 
|-
| Malapterurus electricus || electric catfish || mjaŋ, njan || mínjíryáá || muu || Yes
|-
| Bagrus filamentosus || silver catfish ||  || mumfal [?] ||  || 
|-
| Bagrus bayad, Bagrus docmak || silver catfish || masamanin || múskòò || mazambale || Yes
|-
| Marcusenius cyprinoides ||  || takɗo || paya || paya || No
|-
| Alestes baremoze || African tetras || zantarin saaron || sááróó || saraŋ || No
|-
| Oreochromis niloticus (formerly Tilapia nilotica) || tilapia || andalon || sakiya || kawowo || Yes
|-
| Mormyrus sp. ||  ||  || sááwáyàà ||  || 
|-
| Siluranodon auritus ||  || ? || sháŋsháŋ (given as Synodontis sp. in other sources) || ? || 
|-
| Clarias sp. || catfish || mәsan || tárwáɗáá || bigiri || Yes
|-
| Marcusenius abadii ||  || kurinyin || táátàr̃ || lamsa || Yes
|-
| Campylomormyrus tamandua ||  || tәrwәn, sawayen || tola, kánzáyíí || tólà, sawaya || Yes
|-
| Hydrocynus vittatus || tigerfish || dlayad, dleyal, jik duwan || tságíí || jay || No
|-
| Brycinus nurse || African tetras || zharwon, saron || ƙááwàráá || deda || No
|-
| Chrysichthys nigrodigitatus, Chrysichthys auratus ||  || dumdumi, gajakan || ƙàrááyáá || ŋgaya || Yes
|-
| Auchenoglanis occidentalis, Auchenoglanis biscutatus || catfish || kazhakat || yàuníí || ŋgaya || Yes
|-
| Gymnarchus niloticus ||  || mәzәman || zááwàà || kaaz || No
|}

Writing system 
The Bade language uses a Latin script writing script. The Latin script is the most widely used writing system in the world, serving as the system for the English language as well.

The letter R̃ is only used in the Gashua dialect.

References

Sources

Further reading

External links
UCLA resources on the Bade language 
Bade phonology and morphology
Bade word list
Bade-English-Hausa Dictionary 
 OLAC resources in and about the Bade language

West Chadic languages
Languages of Nigeria
Tonal languages